The second edition of Liège–Bastogne–Liège for Women, a road cycling one-day race in Belgium, was held on 22 April 2018. It was the ninth event of the 2018 UCI Women's World Tour. The race started in Bastogne and finished in Ans, containing four categorized climbs, covering a total distance of 135.5 km.

Anna van der Breggen won the race after she broke clear from Amanda Spratt on the uphill run-up towards the finish. Annemiek van Vleuten was third. It was van der Breggen's second Ardennes classics win of the week after she won Flèche Wallonne, and her fourth World Tour one-day victory of 2018.

Route

The route was identical to that of the 2017 event. At 135.5 km, the race was approximately half the distance of the men's event. It started in Bastogne, from where it headed north past Liège to finish in the industrial suburb of Ans on the same location as the men's race. The route featured four categorized climbs: the Côte de la Vecquée, Côte de La Redoute, Côte de la Roche aux faucons and Côte de Saint-Nicolas. The top of the last climb of Saint-Nicolas comes at 5.5 km from the finish.

Teams
Twenty-three teams, each with a maximum of six riders, started the race:

Race summary

20 riders remained at the front by the top of the climb of La Redoute, with 36 km to go. Pauline Ferrand-Prévot broke away after the top and soon had a 55-second lead, but was caught back by the chasers on the Côte de la Roche-aux-Faucons, at 20 km from the finish. Anna van der Breggen, Annemiek van Vleuten, Ashleigh Moolman and Megan Guarnier had a 25-second lead on the top, but were joined by six others 2 km later. Australian Amanda Spratt immediately accelerated and had a gap of 55 seconds with 10 km to go.

On the Côte de Saint-Nicolas, Anna van der Breggen, Moolman and van Vleuten attacked from the chase group, and at the top van der Breggen had dropped the two others to chase Spratt on her own. The Dutch olympic champion caught Spratt with 5km to go and powered away on the uphill run-in to the finish to win her second consecutive Liège–Bastogne–Liège. Spratt finished second at 6 seconds, van Vleuten outsprinted Moolman for third place.

Results

UCI World Tour

Attributed points

Individual ranking after Liège–Bastogne–Liège

References

2018 UCI Women's World Tour
2018 in Belgian sport
2018
April 2018 sports events in Europe